This is a list of people who served as Lord Lieutenant of County Clare.

There were lieutenants of counties in Ireland until the reign of James II, when they were renamed governors. The office of Lord Lieutenant was recreated on 23 August 1831.

Governors

 Henry O'Brien, 8th Earl of Thomond 1714 
 William O'Brien, 4th Earl of Inchiquin 1741–1777
 The Marquess of Thomond
 The Hon. Sir Francis Nathaniel Burton 1805–1831
 The Right Hon. William Vesey FitzGerald 1815–1831

Lord Lieutenants
 William Vesey-FitzGerald, 2nd Baron FitzGerald and Vesey 7 October 1831 – 11 May 1843
 Lucius O'Brien, 13th Baron Inchiquin May 1843 – 22 March 1872
 Hon. Charles William White 28 May 1872 – January 1879
 Edward O'Brien, 14th Baron Inchiquin 13 January 1879 – 9 April 1900
 Hector Stewart Vandeleur 20 August 1900 – 3 October 1909
 Sir Michael O'Loghlen, 4th Baronet 7 October 1910 – 1922

References

Clare
1831 establishments in Ireland